Lepisorus squamatus is a species of fern known only from Vietnam and from Guangxi Province in southern China. The plant is herbaceous, spreading by rhizomes. The leaves are simple, elliptical, and the sori are round, on the underside of the leaves. The spores are white.

The systematic position of the species varies. It was originally described in the monotypic genus Caobangia as Caobangia squamata. It has also been placed in Lemmaphyllum as Lemmaphyllum squamatum.

References

Polypodiaceae
Ferns of Asia
Flora of Vietnam
Flora of Guangxi
Plants described in 2002